Netherlands competed at the 1976 Summer Paralympics in Toronto, Canada. The team included 58 athletes, 41 men and 17 women. Competitors from Netherlands won 84 medals, including 45 gold, 25 silver and 14 bronze to finish 2nd in the medal table.

Medalists

Source: www.paralympic.org & www.olympischstadion.nl

See also
Netherlands at the Paralympics
Netherlands at the 1976 Summer Olympics

References 

Nations at the 1976 Summer Paralympics
1976
Summer Paralympics